Who Then Now? is a biographical video released by American nu metal band Korn on March 18, 1997. It was certified platinum in the United States by the RIAA on May 5, 1999.

History
It features interviews with the band up to the recording of Life Is Peachy, plus music videos for "Blind", "Shoots and Ladders", "Clown", and "Faget". The last video, "Faget", like "Good God", was never released.

The original VHS is out of production, but it can be found in its entirety on the follow-up release, Deuce, which effectively picks up where Who Then Now? left off and follows the band up to the recording of Untouchables.

Re-release
Korn re-released Who Then Now? in its entirety on DVD on 14 July 2009. It does not include any new extra features.

See also
Korn video albums

References

1997 video albums
Korn video albums
Films directed by McG